Joseph Dunsmore Monteith (June 2, 1865 – January 8, 1934) was an Ontario MLA for Perth North from 1923 to 1934. He was treasurer from 1926 to 1930 and Minister of Labour, Public Works and Highways from 1930 to 1934.

Monteith, a physician born near Stratford, was the son of Andrew Monteith. He was educated in Stratford and studied medicine at Trinity College, Toronto. In 1895, he married Alice Mary Chowen. He served as mayor of Stratford from 1917 to 1918. Monteith defeated Francis Wellington Hay to win the seat in the provincial assembly in 1923. He died in office in 1934.

His son Jay Waldo Monteith later became a member of the House of Commons.

References 
 Canadian Parliamentary Guide, 1925, EJ Chambers

External links

History of Perth County to 1967, WS & HJM Johnston (1957)

1865 births
1934 deaths
Canadian people of Ulster-Scottish descent
Finance ministers of Ontario
Mayors of Stratford, Ontario
Members of the Executive Council of Ontario
Progressive Conservative Party of Ontario MPPs
Trinity College (Canada) alumni
University of Toronto alumni